Eliesa Katoa (born 3 January 2000) is a Tongan professional rugby league footballer who plays as a  forward for the Melbourne Storm in the NRL.

Early life
Katoa was born and raised in Tonga, he then moved to New Zealand to take up a scholarship at Tamaki College, Auckland in 2017 playing rugby union. He was then signed by the New Zealand Warriors.

Playing career
Katoa made his NRL debut in round 1 of the 2020 NRL season for the New Zealand Warriors against Newcastle Knights starting from the bench, in the 20–0 loss. He scored his first try in the Warriors' 18–0 win over the St. George Illawarra Dragons in round 3 of the same season. He was released from his Warriors contract in 2022 to join the Melbourne Storm in 2023 on a two year contract. 

In round 1 of the 2023 NRL season, Katoa made his Melbourne Storm debut against the Parramatta Eels he was with his debut jersey (cap 226).

References

External links
New Zealand Warriors profile

Tongan rugby league players
New Zealand Warriors players
Melbourne Storm players
Rugby league second-rows
Living people
2000 births